Leucadendron linifolium, the line-leaf conebush, is a flower-bearing shrub that belongs to the genus Leucadendron and forms part of the fynbos. The plant is native to the Western Cape, South Africa.


Description

Fire destroys the plant but the seeds survive. The seeds are stored in a toll on the female plant and are released where they fall to the ground and are possibly spread by the wind. The plant is unisexual and there are male and female plants. Insects do the pollination.

Distribution and habitat

The plant occurs in the Cape Flats from Eerste River to the Strand, Bot River to Elim and Bredasdorp, Potberg, and Jakkalsfontein to Riversdal Plains.

Notes

Bibliography
http://redlist.sanbi.org/species.php?species=794-76
http://pza.sanbi.org/leucadendron-linifolium
http://biodiversityexplorer.info/plants/proteaceae/leucadendron_linifolium.htm
https://www.proteaatlas.org.za/conebu9.htm

linifolium